Night Was Our Friend is a 1951 British drama film directed by Michael Anderson and starring Elizabeth Sellars, Michael Gough and Ronald Howard. The title references a line from Virgil's epic poem The Aeneid.

Plot
A young woman is acquitted of the murder of her husband, who died in suspicious circumstances. The film then goes into flashback to portray the events leading up to his death. Sally Raynor's aviator husband Martin has been missing for two years and is believed dead, during which time she has fallen in love with a local doctor, John Harper, whom she plans to marry. When Martin unexpectedly returns from Brazil still alive, she decides to give up the doctor and go back to her life with Martin, although their marriage had not been a happy one. Over the next six months his erratic behaviour, brought on by his ordeal, makes Sally believe he is insane. A close friend of the family, Arthur 'Glan' Glanville, also realises this, as does Dr John Harper and the family's housekeeper. Martin's mother also sees his strange behaviour, but chooses to ignore it. On one of his wild nighttime walks, he attacks someone, a man who only survives by chance. Glan finds evidence of this and tells Sally, saying they must immediately get Martin treatment in a mental hospital, to prevent him being sent to jail. Sally asks Martin to agree to treatment, but the thought of losing his freedom, as happened in Brazil, terrifies him, and he begs her to help him by finding another way. Sally plans to kill him with an overdose of sleeping tablets to protect him from society's punishment, but can't go through with it. Instead, he commits suicide, but Sally is charged with his murder. Glan believes she is innocent, but Martin's mother, despite having seen her son attacking Sally, believes she is guilty. Although innocent of his death, Sally is haunted by guilt and, even after a jury clears her of murder, she is hesitant to marry the doctor she loves.

Cast
 Elizabeth Sellars as Sally Raynor  
 Michael Gough as Martin Raynor  
 Ronald Howard as Dr John Harper
 Marie Ney as Emily Raynor  
 Edward Lexy as Arthur Glanville  
 Nora Gordon as Kate  
 John Salew as Mr Lloyd
 Cyril Smith as Rogers the Reporter  
 Cecil Bevan as Clerk of the Court  
 Felix Felton as Foreman of the Jury 
 Linda Gray as Spinster  
 Edie Martin as Old Lady Jury Member 
 Roger Maxwell as Colonel  
 Michael Pertwee as Young Man

Production
The film was made by ACT Films as a B Movie intended to be released on the lower-half of a double bill. Based on a play by Michael Pertwee the film was made at the Viking Studios in Kensington. The film's sets were designed by art director Duncan Sutherland. It was considered above average for a B film, and was shown on the Odeon circuit of cinemas and also given a release in the United States. Anderson went on to be one of the leading British directors of the decade with films such as Around the World in Eighty Days.

References

Bibliography
 Chibnall, Steve & McFarlane, Brian. The British 'B' Film. Palgrave MacMillan, 2011.

External links

1951 films
British drama films
1951 drama films
British films based on plays
Films set in England
Films directed by Michael Anderson
1950s English-language films
British black-and-white films
1950s British films